Dededo (formerly in Spanish: , in Japanese: , Dededo) is the most populated village in the United States territory of Guam. According to the U.S. Census Bureau, Dededo's population was just under 45,000 in 2020. The village is located on the coral plateau of Northern Guam. The greater Dededo-Machanao-Apotgan Urban Cluster had a population of 139,825 as of the 2010 census, making up 87.7% of Guam's population and 29.8% of its area.

Etymology 
The origin of the village name Dededo, Dedidu in Chamorro, may come from the practice of measuring using fingers. The Spanish word for finger is dedo. It can be theorized that someone measured out the original village this way. Another possibility is that the word "dededo" is a version of the word "dedeggo," which means "heel of the foot," or that it comes from the word "deggo" which means to "walk on tiptoes."

History 

Before World War II, Dededo Village was at the bottom of Macheche Hill. Dededo grew into a major village after the war when the U.S. Navy constructed housing for displaced Guamanians and for laborers coming from off-island to help in Guam's development.

Following Typhoon Karen in 1962, Kaiser Subdivision in Dededo was constructed for islanders displaced by the storm. Further housing subdivisions were constructed increasing the village's population.

In 1984, the Northern Community Health Center opened. In addition to traditional health services provided by the village clinics, this center offered communicable disease control services and dental health as well as chronic disease care and crippled children services.

In October 1988, the island's first large-scale and fully enclosed shopping mall, the Micronesia Mall, opened.

U.S. military installations in the village include Marine Corps Base Camp Blaz, Naval Computer and Telecommunications Station Guam, and portions of Andersen Air Force Base, including Northwest Field.

Demographics
The U.S. Census Bureau has the municipality in multiple census-designated places:
Dededo,
Astumbo,
Finegayan Station,
Liguan,
Machanao,
Machananao East,
Machananao West,
Macheche,
Mogfog,
Ukudu,
Wusstig,
Y Papao,
and Y Sengsong.

Economy
Micronesia Mall is the largest shopping mall in Guam and serves as a cultural and recreational venue as well, with movie theaters and an amusement park.

There is also a popular weekend flea market in town which attracts large crowds of vendors.

Geography 
Dededo is situated on a relatively flat limestone plateau in the northern part of the island. It is located at the north central part of the island roughly at the center of population. The headquarters for the Guam National Wildlife Refuge are in Dededo.

Tourist sites in Dededo include the Ritidian Unit of the Guam National Wildlife Refuge, the Micronesia Mall, Two Lovers Point, as well as parks, trails, and beaches. Beaches include Tanguisson Beach, Shark Cove Beach, Haputo Beach, and Urono Beach. Haputo and Urono Beaches are listed on the U.S. National Register of Historic Places. The South Finegayan Latte Stone Park is also listed on the National Register of Historic Places.

Climate

Education 
Dededo has several public and private schools to accommodate the growing number of residents of the island's most populous village including Guam Department of Education institutions. The village is served by six elementary schools, two middle schools, and one high school.

 Astumbo Elementary School
 Finegayan Elementary School
 Juan M. Guerrero Elementary School
 Maria A. Ulloa Elementary School
 Wettengel Elementary School
 Liguan Elementary School
 Vicente S. A. Benavente Middle School
 Astumbo Middle School
 Okkodo High School

Private schools:
 Santa Barbara Catholic School
 St. Paul's Christian School
 Pacific Christian Academy

Government

Sports
Wettengel Rugby Field and GFA National Training Center are located in Dededo. Guam Track and Field Association is also located in the village.

Notable people
 Joe Duarte, mixed martial artist
 Ping Duenas, politician
 Louise Borja Muna - Guamanian singer, radio host, and politician.
 Anthony Paulino, soccer player
 Regine Tugade, sprinter

Gallery

References

Further reading

External links 

 Dededo Village – Guampedia